Roman Bečvář may refer to:

 Roman Bečvář (handballer, born 1966), Czech former handball player
 Roman Bečvář (handballer, born 1989), Czech handball player